Sweden chose their entry for the Eurovision Song Contest 1981 in the national selection Melodifestivalen 1981. After a tight race, the winner was a song called "Fångad i en dröm", which was performed by Björn Skifs. Björn was also the Swedish representative in the 1978 contest, and had written the song together with Bengt Palmers.

Before Eurovision

Melodifestivalen 1981 
Melodifestivalen 1981 was the selection for the 21st song to represent Sweden at the Eurovision Song Contest. It was the 20th time that this system of picking a song had been used. 90 songs were submitted to SVT for the competition. The final was held in the Cirkus in Stockholm on 21 February 1981, presented by Janne Loffe Carlsson and was broadcast on TV1 but was not broadcast on radio. It was the second time that Lasse Holm and Kikki Danielsson had been beaten into second place by Björn Skifs, after 1978.

Voting

At Eurovision
At the contest, this year held in Dublin, Ireland, Sweden was drawn #20, at the very end of the start field. The song earned maximum points from France and 10 points from Germany, and finally ended up 10th with 50 points.

Voting

References

External links
TV broadcastings at SVT's open archive

1981
Countries in the Eurovision Song Contest 1981
1981
Eurovision
Eurovision